Leskovo is a rural locality (a settlement) in Leskovsky Selsoviet, Vologodsky District, Vologda Oblast, Russia. The population was 707 as of 2002. There are 8 streets.

Geography 
Leskovo is located 16 km west of Vologda (the district's administrative centre) by road. Pochinok is the nearest rural locality.

References 

Rural localities in Vologodsky District